Fred Asparagus (born Fred Reveles; June 10, 1947 – June 30, 1998) was an American comedian and film and television actor. He was perhaps best known for playing the "Bartender" in the 1986 film Three Amigos!.

Born in Los Angeles County, California, Asparagus guest-starred in television programs like Roseanne, Who's the Boss?, Cheers, The John Larroquette Show, CHiPs, Falcon Crest, Something Wilder and Wiseguy. He also appeared in films, such as This Is Spinal Tap, Breakin' 2: Electric Boogaloo, The Five Heartbeats, Dragnet, Beverly Hills Cop III, Just the Ticket and Fatal Beauty.

Asparagus died in June 1998 of a heart attack in Panorama City, California, at the age of 51.

Filmography

Film

Television

References

External links 

Rotten Tomatoes profile

1947 births
1998 deaths
American male film actors
American male television actors
People from Los Angeles County, California
Male actors from Los Angeles County, California
20th-century American male actors